Citibus is the public transportation bus and paratransit system which serves Lubbock, Texas. It runs bus routes throughout the city, with the main routes converging at the Downtown Transfer Plaza, which also houses the Greyhound bus terminal. Citibus has been in continual service since 1971 when the city of Lubbock took over public transit operations. The paratransit system is called Citiaccess.

Citibus operates six days a week from 5:30 a.m. to 8:00 p.m. Monday through Saturday. Nighttime service is supplemented by a curb-to-curb service called the NiteRide. In addition to regular bus routes, it has a partnership with Texas Tech University to run shuttle buses on school days and game-day events.

City Route List 
Route 1 – Dunbar Area
Route 2 – East Broadway
Route 5 – Boston/S. Quaker/South Plains Mall (named Boston/S. Quaker until changes in Fall 2006)
Route 6 – Buddy Holly/50th St. Crosstown (named Ave. H/50th St. Crosstown until changes in Fall 2006)
Route 9 – Ave. Q/S. University/S. Quaker  (named Ave. Q/S. University until changes in Fall 2006; then renamed Ave. Q/S. University/Wal-Mart; and to current name in late 2007)
Route 12 – Arnett Benson/4th St.
Route 14 – Cherry Point
Route 19 – Wayland Plaza/South Plains Mall
Route 34 – 34th St./South Plains Mall

Former Routes 

Route 3 – Tech/Slide Road (became part of realigned Route 5, new Route 19, new Route 34 in Fall 2006)
Route 4 – 82nd/South Plains Mall (became part of realigned Route 5 and Route 9 in Fall 2006)
Route 7 – Guadalupe Area (became part of Route 12 in Fall 2006)
Route 11 – Frankford/South Plains Mall (became part of realigned Route 12 and new Route 19 in Fall 2006)
Route 20 – Frankford Ave. / Target (Created March 5, 2007; Discontinued April 7, 2008)
Route 25 – East/West Express (became part of new Route 19 and new Route 34 in Fall 2006)
Route 82 – Frankford Ave. / Wal-Mart (Created March 5, 2007; Discontinued April 7, 2008)

Campus Route List 
Route 41 – Double T
Route 42 – Red Raider
Route 43 – Masked Rider
Route 44 – North Overton Park
Route 45 – South Overton Park
Route 46 – Northwest
Route 47 – North 4th
Route 48 – North Indiana
Route 49 – Tech Terrace
Route 50 – West 4th Express

Hybrid buses 
Citibus has unveiled six diesel-electric hybrid buses that will begin service on city routes. Managers hope the buses will use 60 percent of the fuel that their older, larger peers consume running customers across the city.  Lubbock purchased the buses with almost $3.3 million in state and federal grant money. The smaller buses seat 23 passengers, can support full-size wheelchairs and will run on all but two city-based routes.  Battery packs showed no signs of failure over the past five years in other cities, the equipment has a lifespan of seven years.

References

External links 

 Official webpage

Bus transportation in Texas
RATP Group
Transportation in Lubbock, Texas
Hybrid electric buses
Transit authorities with electric buses
Transport companies established in 1932
Government agencies established in 1971
1932 establishments in Texas